Message Man is the second album by Eddy Grant. He plays almost every instrument and sings every voice on this album. The uncredited backing band was 90° Inclusive. The album is significant for its socio-political stance in songs such as "Race Hate" and "Cockney Black". The track, "Hello Africa", is considered a major highlight of this album with Grant creating a unique genre that remains difficult to categorize to this day.

Track listing
All tracks composed and arranged by Eddy Grant
"Curfew" – 5:47
"It's Our Time" – 4:33
"Cockney Black" – 3:56
"Jamaican Child" – 3:20
"Get Down Soweto" – 4:38
"Hello Africa" – 11:55
"Race Hate" – 4:47
"Neighbour Neighbour" – 7:33

Personnel
Eddy Grant - lead vocals, all other instruments
Winston Henry - bass on "Curfew", "Jamaican Child" and "Race Hate"
Wayne Bonaparte - bass on "Neighbour Neighbour"
Webster Dyer - organ on "Curfew", "Jamaican Child" and "Race Hate"
Peter Nelson - acoustic piano on "Cockney Black"
Delford Davis - drums on "Curfew", "Jamaican Child" and "Race Hate"
Ron Telemaque - drums on "Hello Africa"
Errol Wise - drums on "Neighbour Neighbour"
Kofi Ayivor - congas on "Hello Africa"
George Agard, Jackie Robinson - backing vocals on all tracks except "Hello Africa" and "Neighbour Neighbour"
Herschell Holder, Lloyd Smith - horns on "It's Our Time"
90° Inclusive was Delford Davis, Henry Barnes, Hugh Francis, Webster Dyer, Winston Henry
Technical
Frank Aggarat - engineer
Dave Field - sleeve design, illustration 
"Thanks to Akwila Simpasa for making me the Message Man, and to Victor Olakau for helping with the translations."

References

1977 albums
Eddy Grant albums